was a district located in Ibaraki Prefecture, Japan.

As of 2003, the district has an estimated population of 40,930 and a density of 246.08 persons per km2. The total area is 166.33 km2.

District timeline
 April 1, 2001 - The town of Itako absorbed the town of Ushibori to create the city of Itako.
 September 2, 2005 - The towns of Asō, Kitaura and Tamatsukuri were merged to create the city of Namegata. Therefore, Namegata District was dissolved as a result of this merger.

Former districts of Ibaraki Prefecture